Las Rozas de Madrid (or simply, Las Rozas) is one of the largest townships and  municipalities in the autonomous community of Madrid, Spain, with an area of 59 km² (22¾ sq. mi.). It is located 20 km (12 miles) northwest of the city of Madrid itself, on the A-6 freeway to A Coruña. Las Rozas is the beginning of this freeway, near the fork road M-505 to El Escorial, which marks the southern boundary of this 'comarca' or rural district (although it is no longer rural).

The municipality is served by four Renfe railway stations–  Las Rozas, Las Matas, El Pinar and El Tejar. A fifth stop, at Peñascales was closed. The municipality shares borders with Torrelodones to the north, Villanueva del Pardillo and Galapagar to the west, the park of Monte del Pardo in the east and Majadahonda (south).

Las Rozas has one of the highest average per capita incomes in the Community of Madrid.

During the final decades of the 20th century the town has  experienced a vigorous building program, mostly  as a dormitory town for Madrid, with a correspondingly strong population growth, which more than doubled between 1991 and 2005 (from 35,137 to 76,246 inhabitants).

The provisioning for local services (such as schools and new dwellings) has at times been outpaced by the locality's high birth and immigration rates. However, by 2010 the community was well served in all health, education and social sectors.

History

Rozas means clearings in Spanish. Various theories exist, for example: The clearing by Romans for military exercises, the collection of firewood or the creation of farmland. According to some historians Las Rozas could be the old Miacum, the name associated with the city of Madrid,  dating from about the third century.

Las Rozas is situated near the river Guadarrama (which flows all year round) and along the ancient road between Segovia and Titulcia (two of the most ancient settlements in the area). The part of this ancient road near Las Rozas is now approximately the A6/M505 route.

During the Spanish civil war it became the site of major battles, a reminder of this time are the concrete forms of bunkers that remain in the Dehesa of Navalcarbón and along the valley of the river Guadarrama.

In the winter of 1936 the pro-Franco troops advanced for the west of Madrid from their bases at Brunete, Villaviciosa de Odón and Campamento.  In the middle of a dense fog with freezing temperature,  Franco's rebels, supported by the air force, engaged the republican forces in one of the bloodiest battles of the civil War.  The inhabitants of Las Rozas took refuge in other places of the nearby Sierra (mountains) such as the caves in Hoyo de Manzanares. These roceños (inhabitants of Las Rozas) who fled were nicknamed cucos, (the sly ones).

When the war was over, the Church of San Miguel and of the 270 houses of the (pre-war)  settlement, 92 were severely damaged and only 13 were intact. The Ministerio de la Gobernación created the Dirección General de Regiones Devastadas for the reconstruction of towns destroyed by the war and Las Rozas was included among them.

Transportation 

Las Rozas can be reached from the Autopista del Noroeste (North-west Freeway) (Freeway that goes from Las Rozas to Adanero(Ávila)), from N-VI National Road from Madrid to A Coruña M-50 (third ring road around Madrid) and M-505 (County Road to El Escorial). This freeway is one of the first in Spain, put on service in early 1967. Then, 22 km (14 miles) from Las Rozas, to Northwest, in Collado Villalba, this freeway, become to Tollway.

There are 7 bus lines that connect the town with Moncloa (Madrid) 621, 624 (Burgo of Las Rozas), 622 (Las Matas), 623 (VillaFranca del Castillo), 626, 628, 629 (new zones like the Business Park, La Dehesa and El Cantizal). There is also another bus line (561) that connects Las Rozas with Aluche (Madrid), passing through Majadahonda and Pozuelo.

Las Rozas  has three main train stations: Las Rozas, near the Old Town in the south of the municipality, Las Matas in the North, and El Pinar. The (dark green) Lines 8 + 9 run from Atocha in the south of Madrid and Chamartín in the north of Madrid via El Tejar, El Pinar and Las Matas to end-stations El Escorial, Cercedilla and Cotos Ski station. Line 10 runs also runs from Atocha, but via a long circular route to Principe Pio in the west of Madrid via Las Rozas, Pinar and Las Matas to Villalba. A circular line runs around Madrid serving Las Rozas. El Tejar is merely an occasional interchange halt between lines 8, 9, and 10 (there are no facilities or habitation nearby). A fifth stop, the halt at Los Peñascales (near Las Matas) was suppressed entirely.

There is a project proposal to encourage ecologically sustainable transport, especially of electrical scooters, entitled Las Rozas: la Capital Verde del Noroeste de Madrid
which suggests either El Pinar or Las Matas should have a park and Ride facility providing access to major retailers in the municipality as well as commuter links to Madrid city. The nearby autovía A-6 is regularly congested at an accident blackspot about "Km 16" (near Majadahonda) some 5 km (3 miles) south of Las Rozas (which is at "Km 22" from Madrid).

Cinema

During the 1960s, Las Rozas was used as a film set, with one studio that Samuel Bronston built being a luxurious mansion near Las Matas. It was one of the most important film studios in Europe and aimed to be the largest in the world, but commercial failures such as 55 Days at Peking prevented Las Rozas from becoming a famous film making location. For the filming of 55 Days at Peking many locals (called "roceños") were employed as extras and as the bricklayers that built the sets decorated them in tribute to the beauty of Ava Gardner. It is believed an artificial river was constructed and filled by tankers.

A road across the Dehesa of Navalcarbón is named in Samuel Bronston's honour. He wished to be buried in Las Rozas, his remains were finally put to rest in the graveyard of Las Rozas.

Culture

There are many cultural activities mainly based around the Joaquín Rodrigo Auditorium, which includes a school of music and dance, four cultural centres, three libraries and five exhibition facilities.

Listed on the official web-site of the municipality there is: an annual Carnival,  Concierts of Sacred Music, Coral Music and Folk Winter Festival as well as The Compositores de España International Piano Competition which has been held here since about 2000.

There are also various themed street-markets, fairs celebrating horsemanship in April, various seafood and tapas exhibitions in the summer and Festibike international cycling event in the autumn.

Sports

Sporting events have always been very important in Las Rozas and it is the only municipality that won two national sports prizes, in part due to the excellent training facilities available.

Las Rozas has a football team (Las Rozas CF) which competes in the Spanish Tercera División (level four of the Spanish football league system). Additionally the town has a futsal team that was recently relegated to the silver division.

Las Rozas has also a Basketball team which competes in Spanish third level called "LIGA LEB Plata". CB Las Rozas is growing year before year and now have more than 31 teams in their rows.  During the 1990s, this team also performed well and narrowly missed out on promotion to the Premier division, today known as Liga ACB.

For the last 15 years Las Rozas has also had a significant Rugby team called A.D Ingenieros Industriales who have competed in the National First Division (the third level in Spanish Rugby). The club uses an artificial pitch in the Cantizal zone.  Also playing at the el Cantizal field are the Las Rozas Black Demons, an American Football team competing in the LNFA.

Another noticeable facility in the municipality is the Ciudad del fútbol de la Real Federación Española de Fútbol (Royal Spanish Football Federation's Football City), build on lands donated by the Town Council. On two occasions the TSJM has failed to secure the return of these municipal plots.

Other popular sports are the Toad in the hole, Hammer throw,  Calva, a sort of Horseshoes and chito, a pastime in which a diskus is aimed at a target upon which a coin is balanced.

Incomplete list of Mayors

 Juan Mingo Barrio  (1576)
 Francisco Labrandero (known as el mozo probably meaning "the younger"), (1576)
 Joseph López Irrarraga (1751)
 Blas Gregorio (1751)
 Matías Rubio (1787)
 Francisco Benito (1787)
 Benito Velasco (1866)
 Baltasar Lázaro (1931)
 Blas Riaza (1935)
 Agustín Plaza (1939)
 Joaquín Lázaro Benito (1942)
 José González Cabeza  (1943–1966)
 Santiago de la Cruz de la Fuente (1966–1970)
 Jesús Benito Sánchez (1971–1979)
Democratically elected Mayors (since the Spanish Constitution of 1978
 Benito Garrido Turrillo  (April 1979 - October 1979)PSOE
 Luis Schake de Miguel (October 1979 - May 1980)PSOE
 Doroteo Lázaro Mingo (May 1980 - October 1981)PSOE
 Luis Schake de Miguel (November 1981 - April 1983)PSOE
 Jesús Zúñiga Pérez-Lemaur (1983–1995) PSOE
 Bonifacio de Santiago Prieto (1995–2011) PP
 José Ignacio Fernández Rubio (2011–Present) PP

Demographics
(
Fuente: Instituto de estadítica de la Comunidad de Madrid
The first column is the value of the data in the municipality, the second is of the Metropolitan Western zone, the third is that of the community and the last one the year.

Popular festivals

 29 September: San Miguel Arcangel Day (St Michael Archangel).  To celebrate the patron saint of the city, bullfights, concerts, gigantic paellas and popular contests are organized.
 First Sunday of May: Virgin of the Retamosa.  The Virgin of the Retamosa is transferred in a procession from the Church of San Miguel Arcangel to the chapel situated in the Dehesa de Navalcarbón, once there a romería with dancing and contests is held.
 1 May: San José Obrero (St Joseph the Worker), Labor Day,(Las Matas). Bullfights and concerts are organized.
 6 January: At midnight on Epiphany, night of the Three Wise Men, draftees light the bonfire they've been preparing during the day, lately this tradition is being lost for two main motives, on one hand the objective was to get together all the young men drafted for active duty (military service), nowadays as the draft has been abolished it does not make sense and on the other hand the site of the bonfire is suffering constant moves due to real estate developments, from being held at the Plaza Mayor, then at the Plaza of Spain, subsequently next to the Auditorium and finally but not last at its present location at the Montecillo.

References

External links
Las Rozas in Google Maps
City Hall of Las Rozas
City Information: news, culture, transports, stores and companies...
Las Rozas daily news

Rozas de Madrid, las